The Taifa of Majorca was a medieval Islamic taifa kingdom which existed from 1018 to 1203 in Majorca. It was founded by the Slavic warlord Mujāhid al-ʿĀmirī.

The first taifa lasted for about 50 years (1076-1116), first succumbing to a Christian crusade and later being occupied by the Almoravids. After a period in which the Balearic Islands were integrated into the Almoravid Empire, it ended up disintegrating, suffering the same fate as the Caliphate of Córdoba. It was ruled by the Aghlabid dynasty, an Arab Najdi dynasty of the Banu Tamim tribe.

A new, independent kingdom arose, the second taifa (1147-1203), under the Banu Ghaniya dynasty, which would become the last Almoravid stronghold in Al-Andalus against the Almohads' advance.

List of Emirs

Mujahid dynasty
 Mujāhid al-ʿĀmirī: 1018–1041
 'Ali Iqbal ud-Dawlah: 1041–1075

Aglabid dynasty
 Ibn Aglab al-Murtada: 1076–1093
 Mubassir: 1093–1114
 Abu-l-Rabi Sulayman "El Burabe": 1114–1126

Ghaniyid dynasty
 Muhammad I: 1126–1155
 Ishaq: –1184
 Muhammad II (deposed in a coup): 1184 d. 1187
 Ali (left to conquer the Maghreb): 1184
 Abu al-Zubayr or Talha: November 1184–1185
 Muhammad II (restored): 1185–1185
 Tashfin: 1185–1187
 'Abdallah: 1187–1203
 To Almohads: 1203–1229

See also
 List of Sunni Muslim dynasties

1203 disestablishments in Europe
States and territories established in 1018
Majorca
Oriental islands of Al-Andalus